Matt Whelan (born 1985) is a New Zealand actor and comedian. Whelan is known for his roles as Brad Caulfield in the New Zealand television comedy-drama programme Go Girls. He has also played Playboy founder Hugh Hefner in the Amazon Original series American Playboy: The Hugh Hefner Story. Whelan plays DEA agent Van Ness in the Netflix original series Narcos.

Early life
Whelan was born in Christchurch, Canterbury on the South Island of New Zealand. Whelan graduated from Toi Whakaari: New Zealand Drama School, one of New Zealand's most prestigious drama schools located in Wellington. Completing a Bachelor of Performing Arts in acting in 2007, immediately upon graduating he joined the cast of Show of Hands, performing alongside Melanie Lynskey.

Career
In April 2017, it was revealed Whelan would be playing the prestigious role as Playboy founder, Hugh Hefner, in the 2017 Amazon original docu-series, American Playboy: The Hugh Hefner Story. The ten-episode series, chronicles the Playboy founder's life, the rise of the magazine and unveils never-before-seen footage from his private archives. Whelan met with Hefner during the filming of the show. It was released just before Hefner's 91st birthday and was partly filmed in Auckland. 
 
After featuring in larger acting roles and gaining popularity playing Hugh Hefner in 2017, Whelan landed a role in the third season of Netflix original series, Narcos. Whelan played Daniel van Ness, a young DEA agent partnered with Chris Feistl (played by Michael Stahl-David), who go to Cali, Colombia after the death of Pablo Escobar under the order of Javier Peña (played by Pedro Pascal) in hopes of taking down the Cali Cartel.

Filmography

Film

Television

Theatre

Awards
 2010 New Zealand film and television awards – Best Performance by a Supporting Actor – Go Girls

References

External links
 

Living people
New Zealand male film actors
New Zealand male television actors
Toi Whakaari alumni
1985 births